The Gottfried Gustav Pitz Barn in Cass County, Nebraska near Plattsmouth, Nebraska is a German banked barn built in 1883 by Gottfried Gustav Pitz.  It was listed on the National Register of Historic Places in 2012.

Pitz came to the United States from Germany in 1868, at age 19.  He was a market gardener who brought produce into Plattsmouth and Omaha to sell.

It is a one-and-a-half-story  plan barn, with a dry brick floor.

It has also been known as the Pia-Muller Barn.

It is located at 903 Livingston Rd.

References

External links

Bank barns
Barns in Nebraska
National Register of Historic Places in Cass County, Nebraska
Buildings and structures completed in 1883